Severo Jurado Lopez (born 9 September 1988) is a Spanish Olympic dressage rider. Representing Spain, he competed at the 2016 Summer Olympics in Rio de Janeiro where he finished 5th in the individual and 7th in the team competitions. His Olympic horse was the chestnut gelding Lorenzo. He was also part of the Spanish Olympic team during the 2020 Summer Olympics, finishing 38th in the Grand Prix and 21st in the Grand Prix Special with his horse Fendi.

In 2015, 2016 and 2017 he won the World Championship for Young Horses with Fiontini.
In 2017 he got the bronze medal in the World Championships for Young Horses with Quel Filou. 
In 2018 he won the World Championships for Young Horses with D'Avie.

Severo has competed in the European Championship on Deep Impact (De Niro x Rubinstein) in 2017 in Gothenburg (Sweden) and also the World Equestrian Games in Tryon (USA) in 2018.

References

Living people
1988 births
Spanish male equestrians
Spanish dressage riders
Equestrians at the 2016 Summer Olympics
Equestrians at the 2020 Summer Olympics
Olympic equestrians of Spain